A mating call is an auditory signal used by animals.

Mating call may also refer to:

 Mating Call, 1958 album by Tadd Dameron and John Coltrane, or the title track
 Mating Call (Roberto Magris album), 2010 jazz album by Roberto Magris 
 The Mating Call, 1928 silent film about a soldier returning from WWI

See also

 Tainted Love: Mating Calls and Fight Songs (album) 2007 album by Shivaree
 
 Mating (disambiguation)
 Call (disambiguation)
 Booty Call (disambiguation)
 Sexual reproduction
 Sexual intercourse
 Courtship